Nkozi is a town in central Uganda. It is one of the urban centers in Mpigi District.

Location
The coordinates of Nkozi town are:00 00 36N, 32 00 00E (Latitude:0.0100; Longitude:32.0000).

Population
The exact population of Nkozi is not known, as of February 2010.

Points of interest
The following points of interest lie within the town limits or close to the edges of town:

 The offices of Nkozi Town Council
 Nkozi Central Market
 The main campus of Uganda Martyrs University (UMU), one of Uganda's nearly 40 public and private universities.
 Nkozi Hospital - A 100-bed community hospital administered by the Catholic Church.

External links
 Location of Nkozi at Google Maps
 Uganda Martyrs University Internet Portal

See also

 Mpigi District
 Katonga River
 Lake Victoria
 Uganda Martyrs University
 Lukaya

References

 
Populated places in Uganda
Populated places on Lake Victoria
Mpigi District